Golfingiida, also known as the Golfingiiformes, is an order of peanut worms.  The tentacles form a circle around the mouth, while those of the sister taxon, Phascolosomatidea, are only found above the mouth. Most species burrow in the substrate but some live in the empty shells of gastropods. It is an order of the class Sipuncula (previously considered a phylum), and contains the following families:

 Golfingiidae
 Phascolionidae
Sipunculidae Rafinesque, 1814
 Themistidae

References

External links

 Tree of Life Web Project

Sipunculans
Protostome orders